The following highways are numbered 31C:

India
  National Highway 31C (India)

United States
 Nebraska Spur 31C
 New York State Route 31C (former)